The Women's team pursuit race of the 2015 World Single Distance Speed Skating Championships was held on 14 February 2015.

Results
The race was started at 17:15.

References

Women's team pursuit
World